The Billboard Top Latin Songs ranked the best-performing songs on Spanish-language radio stations and was published by Billboard magazine weekly. Since 1994, Nielsen BDS was used to measure the songs on the chart. On the week ending October 20, 2012, Billboard changed the methodology on the Hot Latin Songs to include digital downloads and streaming in addition to airplay from all radio stations in the United States, as opposed to just Spanish-language radio stations. Billboard also included imposed a linguistic rule in which only songs predominantly sung in Spanish are eligible to rank on the Hot Latin Songs chart. The Hot Latin Song's former methodology was formatted into the Latin Airplay chart.

Chart history

Hot Latin Songs

Latin Airplay

References

External links
Current Top Latin Songs Chart

United States Latin Songs
2012
2012 in Latin music